is the fourth single of the J-pop singer Aya Matsuura, who was a Hello! Project solo artist at the time. It was released on November 28, 2001 under the Zetima label. The song reached a peak of #2 on the weekly Oricon charts, and charted for 7 weeks.

Track listing 
  – 4:37
Lyrics and composition: Tsunku / arrangement: Takao Konishi
 "Merry X'mas for You" – 3:58
Lyrics and composition: Tsunku / arrangement: Yuichi Takahashi
 "100Kai no Kiss" (Instrumental) – 4:35

References

External links 
 100Kai no Kiss entry on the Up-Front Works official website

Aya Matsuura songs
Zetima Records singles
2001 singles
Songs written by Tsunku
Song recordings produced by Tsunku
2001 songs